The sum of public power is a legal term from Argentina, included in its constitution. It represents the sum of the three powers, and deems the complete delegation of them into the executive power as a crime of high treason.

The term was created in 1835, when governor Juan Manuel de Rosas was granted such powers by the legislature of Buenos Aires. Justo José de Urquiza led an army to depose Rosas in order to enact a Constitution, which Rosas had delayed for years, and the 1853 Constitution legally forbade such a thing from happening again.

Historical context
The death of the federalist caudillo Facundo Quiroga caused great concern in the Argentine Confederation, and soon the legislature of Buenos Aires elected Rosas as governor. A law from August 3, 1821, allowed the legislature to grant those powers. Those powers were fully delegated on him, with the sole exceptions of keeping, defending and protecting the Roman Catholic Church, and keeping and defending the cause of the Confederation. The term of office of the governor, of three years, was extended to five years. The legislature reelected Rosas three times, allowing him three full mandates of 5 years, being overthrown during the fourth. Rosas could use the sum of public power during any time period he deemed convenient during his mandate.

To confirm the legitimacy of his mandate, Rosas requested a vote to approve or reject him. Although there was no universal suffrage in Argentina by then, Rosas requested that all the people in Buenos Aires was allowed to vote, regardless of wealth or social conditions. This proposal was influenced by Jean-Jacques Rousseau's The Social Contract. The only ones who could not vote were the women, the slaves, children under 20 years old (unless emancipated) and foreigners without a stable residence in the country. The final result had 9720 votes for Rosas and only 8 against him.

Nature
Although Rosas received the sum of public power, he did not become an absolute monarch. He still had a limited term of office, and the legislature and other republican institutions were kept.

It was not a tyranny either, as he did not have the usual traits of a tyranny. He did not take the power by an illegal way, such as a coup d'état, but by an appointment of the legislature, and no law prevented the legislature from doing what it did. He did not become governor against the will of the population, as it was confirmed by a popular vote. He did not rule on behalf of a social minority, either.

His appointment was in line with the ideas of Rousseau, who thought that "If, on the other hand, the peril is of such a kind that the paraphernalia of the laws are an obstacle to their preservation, the method is to nominate a supreme ruler, who shall silence all the laws and suspend for a moment the sovereign authority. In such a case, there is no doubt about the general will, and it is clear that the people's first intention is that the State shall not perish". This principle influenced as well the concept of the state of emergency, included in the 1853 constitution and in most legal systems around the world.

Actual usage
Rosas did not fully use the powers invested in him. He did not close the legislature, which continued working during his rule. He was not interested in the tasks of the judiciary power, so he did not use any judiciary powers after the end of the trial about the death of Facundo Quiroga. Even more, the governor used to be the highest court of appeal since the times of Spanish authority, so the legislature sanctioned a law in 1838 that established the "Tribunal Supremo de Recursos Extraordinarios", so that the highest court of the judiciary was still outside the executive power. Rosas gave his consent to the new law immediately.

Controversy
The delegation of the sum of public power on Rosas was highly controversial. Domingo Faustino Sarmiento compared Rosas with other historical dictators in his work Facundo, where he said as follows:

On the contrary, José de San Martín gave his full support to the delegation, on the grounds that the current situation in the country was so chaotic that it was needed to create order.

Constitutional status
Rosas's mandate ended after his defeat at the Battle of Caseros, and Urquiza called for the making of a National Constitution, which was written the following year, 1853. The 29º article explicitly forbids a delegation of powers such as the one done with Rosas to be performed.

However, the penalty for the 1835 release of the public power to Rosas is not affected by this ruling, as the Constitution was not established back then and had no ex post facto law provisions.

References

Bibliography
 
 

Juan Manuel de Rosas
Law of Argentina
Argentine Civil War
Emergency laws
1835 in law
1835 establishments in Argentina